The Western Association of Architects (WAA) was an American professional body founded in Chicago in 1884 separately from the American Institute of Architects (AIA) by John Wellborn Root, Daniel Burnham, Dankmar Adler, and Louis Sullivan, because they felt slighted by East Coast architects of the AIA. "Members consisted of architects from the Midwest and the South with chapters forming in many states. The WAA was the first architectural organization to petition for licensure of architects. Many architects were members of both WAA and AIA...." The WAA merged with the AIA in 1889.

List of members
Dankmar Adler
Louise Blanchard Bethune
Daniel Burnham
John Wellborn Root, president in 1886
Louis Sullivan
Bernard Vonnegut Sr.
Mason Maury
William J. Dodd

References

 
Organizations established in 1884
Organizations disestablished in 1889
Architecture-related professional associations